The 1876 North Norfolk by-election was fought on 21 April 1876.  The byelection was fought due to the death of the incumbent Conservative MP, Frederick Walpole.  It was won by the Conservative candidate James Duff.

References

1876 in England
1876 elections in the United Kingdom
By-elections to the Parliament of the United Kingdom in Norfolk constituencies
19th century in Norfolk